The 1993 Wimbledon Championships was a tennis tournament played on grass courts at the All England Lawn Tennis and Croquet Club in Wimbledon, London in the United Kingdom. It was the 107th edition of the Wimbledon Championships and was held from Monday 21 June to Sunday 4 July

Prize money
The total prize money for 1993 championships was £5,048,450. The winner of the men's title earned £305,000 while the women's singles champion earned £275,000.

* per team

Champions

Seniors

Men's singles

 Pete Sampras defeated  Jim Courier, 7–6(7–3), 7–6(8–6), 3–6, 6–3
 It was Sampras' 2nd career Grand Slam singles title and his 1st Wimbledon title.

Women's singles

 Steffi Graf defeated  Jana Novotná, 7–6(8–6), 1–6, 6–4
 It was Graf's 13th career Grand Slam singles title and her 5th Wimbledon title.

Men's doubles

 Todd Woodbridge /  Mark Woodforde defeated  Grant Connell /  Patrick Galbraith, 7–5, 6–3, 7–6(7–4)
 It was Woodbridge's 4th career Grand Slam title and his 1st Wimbledon title. It was Woodforde's 6th career Grand Slam title and his 1st Wimbledon title.

Women's doubles

 Gigi Fernández /  Natasha Zvereva defeated  Larisa Neiland /  Jana Novotná, 6–4, 6–7(4–7), 6–4
 It was Fernández's 9th career Grand Slam title and her 2nd Wimbledon title. It was Zvereva's 10th career Grand Slam title and her 3rd Wimbledon title.

Mixed doubles

 Mark Woodforde /  Martina Navratilova defeated  Tom Nijssen /  Manon Bollegraf, 6–3, 6–4
 It was Woodforde's 7th career Grand Slam title and his 2nd Wimbledon title. It was Navratilova's 55th career Grand Slam title and her 18th Wimbledon title.

Juniors

Boys' singles

 Răzvan Sabău defeated  Jimy Szymanski, 6–1, 6–3

Girls' singles

 Nancy Feber defeated  Rita Grande, 7–6(7–3), 1–6, 6–2

Boys' doubles

 Steven Downs /  James Greenhalgh defeated  Neville Godwin /  Gareth Williams, 6–7(6–8), 7–6(7–4), 7–5

Girls' doubles

 Laurence Courtois /  Nancy Feber defeated  Hiroko Mochizuki /  Yuka Yoshida, 6–3, 6–4

Singles seeds

Men's singles
  Pete Sampras (champion)
  Stefan Edberg (semifinals, lost to Jim Courier)
  Jim Courier (final, lost to Pete Sampras)
  Boris Becker (semifinals, lost to Pete Sampras)
  Goran Ivanišević (third round, lost to Todd Martin)
  Michael Stich (quarterfinals, lost to Boris Becker)
  Ivan Lendl (second round, lost to Arnaud Boetsch)
  Andre Agassi (quarterfinals, lost to Pete Sampras)
  Richard Krajicek (fourth round, lost to Andre Agassi)
  Andriy Medvedev (second round, lost to Cédric Pioline)
  Petr Korda (fourth round, lost to Michael Stich)
  Michael Chang (third round, lost to David Wheaton)
  Wayne Ferreira (fourth round, lost to Jim Courier)
  MaliVai Washington (second round, lost to Aaron Krickstein)
  Karel Nováček (first round, lost to Luis Herrera)
  Thomas Muster (first round, lost to Olivier Delaître)

Women's singles
  Steffi Graf (champion)
  Martina Navratilova (semifinals, lost to Jana Novotná)
  Arantxa Sánchez Vicario (fourth round, lost to Helena Suková)
  Gabriela Sabatini (quarterfinals, lost to Jana Novotná)
  Mary Joe Fernández (third round, lost to Zina Garrison-Jackson)
  Conchita Martínez (semifinals, lost to Steffi Graf)
  Jennifer Capriati (quarterfinals, lost to Steffi Graf)
  Jana Novotná (final, lost to Steffi Graf)
  Anke Huber (fourth round, lost to Gabriela Sabatini)
  Magdalena Maleeva (third round, lost to Yayuk Basuki)
  Manuela Maleeva-Fragnière (second round, lost to Naoko Sawamatsu)
  Katerina Maleeva (first round, lost to Natasha Zvereva)
  Mary Pierce (withdrew before the tournament began)
  Amanda Coetzer (second round, lost to Shaun Stafford)
  Helena Suková (quarterfinals, lost to Conchita Martínez)
  Nathalie Tauziat (fourth round, lost to Martina Navratilova)

References

External links
 Official Wimbledon Championships website

 
Wimbledon Championships
Wimbledon Championships
June 1993 sports events in the United Kingdom
July 1993 sports events in the United Kingdom